Private Aung San Thuriya  Suk Bahdur Rai (Burmese: ဆွတ်(ခ်)ဗဟာဒူးရိုင်း) (serial No.(kyee) 01914) was the only Gurkha (ဂေါ်ရခါး in Burmese) to have received Aung San Thuriya medal, the highest and most prestigious award in Myanmar (Burma) for gallantry and bravery in the face of enemy.   

He was killed in action while fighting against invading Kuomintang (KMT) troops of General Li Mi of China in the Battle of Tachileik Highway in Shan State, Myanmar in 1950. Throughout the action, he displayed conspicuous gallantry and responsible for killing several enemy combatants.   

Suk Bahdur Rai was honoured and awarded Aung San Thuriya medal posthumously by President Mahn Win Maung.

Commemorations 
 Aung San Thuriya Suk Bahadur Rai Street in downtown Yangon is named in his honour.

References 

Recipients of orders, decorations, and medals of Myanmar
Military personnel killed in action
Burmese people of Nepalese descent
Burmese Hindus
Burmese military personnel
1950 deaths
Rai people